Quadrille is a 1999 Russian comedy film directed by Viktor Titov.

Plot 
The film tells about two families who live in the Baikal village. Suddenly, two neighbors decided to swap their husbands.

Cast 
 Oleg Tabakov as Sanya Arefyev
 Lyubov Polishchuk as Lida Zvyagintseva
 Stanislav Lyubshin as Nikolay Zvyagintsev
 Valentina Telichkina as Valya Orefyeva
 Nina Usatova as Makeyevna

References

External links 
 

1999 films
1990s Russian-language films
Russian comedy films
1999 comedy films